In telecommunication, an enhanced-non-return-to-zero-level (E-NRZ-L) line code is a binary code in which 1s are represented as low level and 0s are represented as high level condition with no other neutral or rest condition, similar to Non-return-to-zero; However, the major enhancement over NRZ is the addition of a parity bit (usually odd parity) to the end of the bit stream.

References

Line codes